The 2020 United States presidential election in Connecticut was held on Tuesday, November 3, 2020, as part of the 2020 United States presidential election in which all 50 states plus the District of Columbia participated. Connecticut voters chose electors to represent them in the Electoral College via a popular vote, pitting the Republican Party's nominee, incumbent President Donald Trump, and running mate Vice President Mike Pence against Democratic Party nominee, former Vice President Joe Biden, and his running mate California Senator Kamala Harris. Connecticut has seven electoral votes in the Electoral College.

Connecticut voted 16% more Democratic than the national average.

Primary elections
The primary elections were originally scheduled for April 28, 2020. On March 19, they were moved to June 2 due to concerns over the COVID-19 pandemic. Then on April 17, they were further pushed back to August 11.

Republican primary
The state had 28 delegates to the 2020 Republican National Convention, all going to Trump.

Democratic primary

Libertarian caucus

Voting took place from April 25–28, 2020.

General election

Predictions

Polling

Graphical summary

Aggregate polls

Polls

with Donald Trump and Pete Buttigieg

with Donald Trump and Kamala Harris

with Donald Trump and Bernie Sanders

with Donald Trump and Elizabeth Warren

Results

By county

By town

By congressional district
Biden won all five congressional districts.

Analysis 
Biden won the state by 20 points, a notable improvement from Hillary Clinton's 13-point win in the state in 2016. He fared especially well in Fairfield County, an ancestrally Republican area, as well as the Hartford suburbs. Biden also came within 5 points of flipping traditionally Republican Litchfield County, which had previously voted Democratic in 2008; and 4.2 points of flipping traditionally Democratic Windham County, which had previously voted Democratic in 2012.

Per exit polls by the Associated Press, Biden's strength in Connecticut came from college-educated and high income voters. Biden won a combined 70% in large cities and 62% in suburban areas, a key demographic in a heavily suburban state. Biden built on Hillary Clinton's gains in suburban Fairfield County, even flipping three towns: Trumbull, Brookfield, and Sherman. Trumbull and Brookfield had last voted Democratic in 1964, while Sherman last voted Democratic in 2008. 

Biden is the first presidential nominee ever to exceed 1 million votes in the state. Additionally, his total is currently the highest that any candidate in any race in Connecticut has received, surpassing the previous record of 1,008,714 that Richard Blumenthal received in his 2016 Senate race. At the same time, Biden became the first Democrat to win the White House without carrying Windham County since Woodrow Wilson in 1916. He also become the first Democrat to win without the town of Griswold since 1888, the first to win without the town of Sprague since 1892, the first to win without the towns of Killingly, Plainfield, Putnam, and Stafford since 1916, the first to win without Lisbon and Plainville since 1948, and the first to win without the town of Salem since 1960.

See also
 United States presidential elections in Connecticut
 2020 United States presidential election
 2020 Democratic Party presidential primaries
 2020 Republican Party presidential primaries
 2020 United States elections

Notes

References

Further reading

External links
 
 
  (state affiliate of the U.S. League of Women Voters)
 

Connecticut
2020
Presidential